Cochylidia altivaga is a species of moth of the family Tortricidae. It is found in China (Gansu, Sichuan) and Nepal.

The wingspan is about 14 mm.

References

Moths described in 1976
Cochylini